My Nights Are More Beautiful Than Your Days is a 1989 French drama film written and directed by Andrzej Żuławski from a 1985 novel of the same name by Raphaële Billetdoux. In unique dialogue full of rhymes, puns and quotations, it tells the story of a sudden love affair between two gifted but damaged people who end their lives together.

Plot
In Paris, Lucas is a talented and successful computer scientist who is diagnosed with a rare and fatal brain disorder, which means he will rapidly lose his memory and his ability to speak coherently. Going from the hospital to a café, he is struck by a beautiful but eccentric young woman called Blanche. When she walks out on him just after he orders them dinner, he waits in the street until dawn. Driving by, she stops and weeps at his devotion, but has to go to work. 

Her job is in a hotel at Biarritz, where she does a clairvoyant act removing her clothes. He follows her there and takes a luxury suite. At dawn she comes in exhausted and falls asleep. Just after he orders them breakfast she walks out, not realising that his awkward remarks are through failing mental powers. 

Later she returns and the two make love. She too is under heavy stress, forced by her promiscuous mother into an exploitative act she detests. That night she breaks down on stage and at dawn comes to find Lucas. He takes her onto the deserted beach, where the two laugh and kiss as they walk to their deaths in the Atlantic breakers.

Cast
Sophie Marceau — Blanche 
Jacques Dutronc — Lucas 
Valérie Lagrange — Blanche's mother
 — Edwige 
Laure Killing — Ines 
François Chaumette — Hotel concierge 
Sady Rebbot — François
 Salim Talbi — Hotel page

References

External links

My Nights are More Beautiful Than your Days (1989) at Rotten Tomatoes

1989 drama films
1989 films
French drama films
Films directed by Andrzej Żuławski
1980s French films